The Popular University of Nicaragua (Spanish: Universidad Popular de Nicaragua (UPONIC)) is a private university located in Managua, Nicaragua, founded in 1992.

Faculties
 Faculty of Economics
 Faculty of Educational Sciences
 Faculty of Law and Political Sciences
 Faculty of Natural Medicine
 Faculty of Engineering
 Faculty of Informatics
 Faculty of Agricultural Sciences

References

Universities in Nicaragua
Educational institutions established in 1992
1992 establishments in Nicaragua